Heavenly Ecstasy is the fifth studio album by the Norwegian progressive metal band Pagan's Mind, released on 20 May 2011 in Germany, 23 May in the rest of Europe, and 31 May in the USA and Canada. It is the first album the band has released with label Steamhammer Records.

The album was released in several formats: as a digipak with two bonus tracks, 28-page booklet, and poster; a double gatefold LP with two bonus tracks on orange-colored vinyl; as a standard jewel case; and as a digital download.

Release and promotion 
On 29 April 2011 the heavy metal news site Metal Injection premiered a music video for the song "Intermission".

Track listing

Personnel

Pagan's Mind
 Nils K. Ruelead vocals
 Jørn Viggo Lofstadguitar
 Steinar Krokmobass
 Stian Lindaas Kristoffersendrums
 Ronny Tegnerkeyboards

External links 
 Video for the song "Intermission"

Notes 

Pagan's Mind albums
SPV/Steamhammer albums
2011 albums